Xining Subdistrict  is a subdistrict situated in Chuanshan District, Suining, Sichuan, China. , it administers the following four residential neighborhoods and four villages:
Neighborhoods
Jingui Community
Wenxingqiao Community
Qinggang Community
Wuliya Community

Villages
Zhangshuyan Village
Lanjing Village
Fuguangmiao Village
Xujiayan Village

See also
List of township-level divisions of Sichuan

References

Township-level divisions of Sichuan
Suining